Sasin School of Management (also known as Sasin Graduate Institute of Business Administration of Chulalongkorn University) is an AACSB and EQUIS accredited business school founded in 1982 through a collaboration among Chulalongkorn University and the Kellogg School of Management and the Wharton Business School. Sasin became the first school in Thailand to receive AACSB accreditation in 2010 and the first to receive EQUIS EFMD accreditation in 2011.

Meaning of name
His Majesty King Bhumibol Adulyadej bestowed the name on the Graduate Institute of Business Administration on his 60th birthday, 5 December 1987. The name comes from two Sanskrit words: "sasa" and "indra". Sasa, meaning "rabbit" represents the king's birth year in the Thai 12-year astrological cycle. Indra means "chief." Thus "Sasin" literally means "king of the rabbits."

Programs

Sasin pioneered the use of visiting professors complemented by full-time Sasin faculty and other experts in Southeast Asia.

Sasin programs, conducted in English, include:

 The Flexible (MBA)
 Dual MBA & Master of Engineering
 Executive MBA
 Executive Education: Senior Executive Program (SEP), Management programs (public), Corporate programs (in-company)

Sasin faculty
The Director (Dean) of Sasin is Professor Ian Fenwick, Ph.D.

The founder of Sasin is Professor Toemsakdi Krishnamra, who served as director (dean) from 1982 to 2014. He also served as president of Association of Asia-Pacific Business Schools in 2009.

Sasin's full-time faculty members hold doctoral degrees from internationally recognized universities such as Carnegie Mellon University, University of Cambridge, Imperial College, Kellogg School of Management (Northwestern), London School of Business (currently, London Business School), University of Oxford, University of Southern California, and University of Michigan.

Prominent alumni
Sasin has produced a number of business leaders, including:
 Arthid Nanthawithaya, chief executive officer, Siam Commercial Bank Public Co., Ltd.		
 Suparatana Bencharongkul, Chief Operating Officer, Rakbenkerd Group.	
 Artirat Charukitpipat, chief executive officer at Bumrungrad International Hospital			
 Aung Kyaw Moe, Founder and Group CEO of 2C2P (payment gateway)			
 Banyong Pongpanich, chairman at Phatra Securities Plc & Director, chairman of the executive committee, Member of the Risk Management Committee at Kiatnakin Bank Public Company Limited			
 Bhurit Bhirombhakdi, chief executive officer, Boonrawd Trading Co., Ltd.					
 Charn Srivikorn, chairman and director of Gaysorn Property and Gaysorn Asset Land Management			
 Douglas Clayton, Founder and chief executive officer of Leopard Capital			
 Dr. Prasarn Bhiraj Buri, chief executive officer of BHIRAJ BURI GROUP			
 Kaveepan Eiamsakulrat, executive chairman, K.E. Group Co., Ltd.			
 Kittiratt Na-Ranong, former deputy director of Sasin, former Minister of Commerce, former Deputy Prime Minister of Thailand 			
 M.L. Dispanadda Diskul, chief executive officer of Mae Fah Luang Foundation 			
 Pawoot Pongvitayapanu, chief executive officer & founder TARAD.com 			
 Somhatai Panichewa, chief executive officer & director Amata VN PCL                			
 Somjate Moosirilert, chief executive officer, Thanachart Capital Public Company Limited 			
 Sudarat Keyuraphan, Chairperson of The Lumbini Development Project and Chairwoman of Pheu Thai Party's strategic committee 			
 Thitinan Wattanavekin, Head of Wealth Management, Kiatnakin Bank Public Co., Ltd.			
 Vichai Bencharongkul, president, Benchachinda Holding Co., Ltd.

Sasin Japan Center (SJC)
Sasin Japan Center (SJC) offers business management consulting for Japanese companies in Thailand. It also offers management training, management seminars, and market research.

SJC has three domains:
 research, working with Japanese top universities,
 education, providing Japanese executives with comprehensive management education program in collaboration with Sasin Executive Education Center and Japan Management Association (JMA),
 consulting, solving business challenges with Sasin Management Consulting and Japan Management Association Consulting (JMAC).

References 

Chulalongkorn University
Business schools in Thailand
Education in Bangkok
Educational institutions established in 1982
1982 establishments in Thailand
University departments in Thailand